Robert Wilhelm Eberhard Bunsen (
30 March 1811
– 16 August 1899) was a German chemist. He investigated emission spectra of heated elements, and  discovered caesium (in 1860) and rubidium (in 1861) with the physicist Gustav Kirchhoff. The Bunsen–Kirchhoff Award for spectroscopy is named after Bunsen and Kirchhoff.

Bunsen also developed several gas-analytical methods, was a pioneer in photochemistry, and did early work in the field of organic arsenic chemistry. With his laboratory assistant Peter Desaga, he developed the Bunsen burner, an improvement on the laboratory burners then in use.

Early life and education
Bunsen was  born in Göttingen, Germany in 1811, in what is now the state of Lower Saxony in Germany. Bunsen was the youngest of four sons of the University of Göttingen's chief librarian and professor of modern philology, Christian Bunsen (1770–1837).

After attending school in Holzminden, Bunsen matriculated at Göttingen in 1828 and studied chemistry with Friedrich Stromeyer, mineralogy with Johann Friedrich Ludwig Hausmann, and mathematics with Carl Friedrich Gauss. After obtaining a PhD in 1831, Bunsen spent 1832 and 1833 traveling in France, Germany, and Austria. During his journeys, Bunsen met the scientists Friedlieb Runge (who discovered aniline and in 1819 isolated caffeine), Justus von Liebig in Giessen, and Eilhard Mitscherlich in Bonn.

Academic career
In 1833, Bunsen became a lecturer at Göttingen and began experimental studies of the (in)solubility of metal salts of arsenous acid. His discovery of the use of iron oxide hydrate as a precipitating agent led to what is still today the most effective antidote against arsenic poisoning. This interdisciplinary research was carried on and published in conjunction with the physician Arnold Adolph Berthold. In 1836, Bunsen succeeded Friedrich Wöhler at the Polytechnic School of Kassel. Bunsen taught there for three years, and then accepted an associate professorship at the University of Marburg, where he continued his studies on cacodyl derivatives. He was promoted to full professorship in 1841. While at University of Marburg, Bunsen participated in the 1846 expedition for the investigation of Iceland's volcanoes.

Bunsen's work brought him quick and wide acclaim, partly because cacodyl, which is extremely toxic and undergoes spontaneous combustion in dry air, is so difficult to work with. Bunsen almost died from arsenic poisoning, and an explosion with cacodyl cost him sight in his right eye. His work with Cadet's fuming liquid was an important step in the development of the radical theory of organic compounds.

In 1841, Bunsen created the Bunsen cell battery, using a carbon electrode instead of the expensive platinum electrode used in William Robert Grove's electrochemical cell. Early in 1851 he accepted a professorship at the University of Breslau, where he taught for three semesters. 

In late 1852, Bunsen became the successor of Leopold Gmelin at the University of Heidelberg. There he used electrolysis to produce pure metals, such as chromium, magnesium, aluminium, manganese, sodium, barium, calcium, and lithium. A long collaboration with Henry Enfield Roscoe began in 1852, in which they studied the photochemical formation of hydrogen chloride (HCl) from hydrogen and chlorine. From this work, the reciprocity law of Bunsen and Roscoe originated. He discontinued his work with Roscoe in 1859 and joined Gustav Kirchhoff to study emission spectra of heated elements, a research area called spectrum analysis. For this work, Bunsen and his laboratory assistant, Peter Desaga, had perfected a special gas burner by 1855, which was influenced by earlier models. The newer design of Bunsen and Desaga, which provided a very hot and clean flame, is now called simply the "Bunsen burner", a common laboratory equipment.

There had been earlier studies of the characteristic colors of heated elements, but nothing systematic. In the summer of 1859, Kirchhoff suggested to Bunsen that he should try to form prismatic spectra of these colors. By October of that year, the two scientists had invented an appropriate instrument, a prototype spectroscope. Using it, they were able to identify the characteristic spectra of sodium, lithium, and potassium. After numerous laborious purifications, Bunsen proved that highly pure samples gave unique spectra. In the course of this work, Bunsen detected previously unknown new blue spectral emission lines in samples of mineral water from Dürkheim. He guessed that these lines indicated the existence of an undiscovered chemical element. After careful distillation of forty tons of this water, in the spring of 1860 he was able to isolate 17 grams of a new element. He named the element "caesium", after the Latin word for deep blue. The following year he discovered rubidium, by a similar process.

In 1860, Bunsen was elected a foreign member of the Royal Swedish Academy of Sciences.

He was elected as a member of the American Philosophical Society in 1862.

In 1877, Robert Bunsen together with Gustav Robert Kirchhoff were the first recipients of the prestigious Davy Medal "for their researches and discoveries in spectrum analysis".

Personality
Bunsen tatti was one of the most universally admired scientists of his generation. He was a master teacher, devoted to his students, and they were equally devoted to him. At a time of vigorous and often caustic scientific debates, Bunsen always conducted himself as a perfect gentleman, maintaining his distance from theoretical disputes. He much preferred to work quietly in his laboratory, continuing to enrich his science with useful discoveries. As a matter of principle he never took out a patent. He never married.

Despite his lack of pretension, Bunsen was a vivid "chemical character", had a well-developed sense of humour, and is the subject of many amusing anecdotes.

Retirement and death
When Bunsen retired in 1889 at the age of 78, he shifted his work solely to geology and mineralogy, interests which he had pursued throughout his career. He died in Heidelberg, Germany on 16 August 1899, at the age of 88.

See also
 Bunsenite
 Flash (photography)
 Geysir
 Lepidolite
 List of German inventors and discoverers
 Photobiology
 Volcanic gas

Notes

References

Further reading

  Gasometry: Comprising the Leading Physical and Chemical Properties of Gases by Robert Bunsen; translated by Henry Roscoe. London: Walton and Maberly, 1857
 Robert Wilhelm Bunsen, by Georg Lockemann, 1949.
 Sir Henry Roscoe's "Bunsen Memorial Lecture", in: Trans. Chem. Soc., 1900, reprinted (in German) with other obituary notices in an edition of Bunsen's collected works published by Wilhelm Ostwald and Max Bodenstein in 3 vols. at Leipzig in 1904. This is Gesammelte Abhandlungen von Robert Bunsen: im Auftrage der Deutschen Bunsen-Gesellschaft für angewandte Physikalische Chemie hrsg. von Wilhelm Ostwald und Max Bodenstein. 3 Bände. Leipzig: W. Engelmann, 1904

External links

 
 Robert Wilhelm Bunsen
 

1811 births
1899 deaths
19th-century German chemists
Battery inventors
Caesium
Corresponding members of the Saint Petersburg Academy of Sciences
Foreign Members of the Royal Society
Foreign associates of the National Academy of Sciences
19th-century German inventors
Academic staff of Heidelberg University
Members of the French Academy of Sciences
Members of the Royal Swedish Academy of Sciences
Scientists from Göttingen
People from the Kingdom of Hanover
People of the Industrial Revolution
Rare earth scientists
Recipients of the Copley Medal
Recipients of the Pour le Mérite (civil class)
Rubidium
Spectroscopists
Academic staff of the University of Breslau
University of Göttingen alumni
Academic staff of the University of Marburg
Manchester Literary and Philosophical Society
Members of the Göttingen Academy of Sciences and Humanities